Jennifer Logan is an atmospheric scientist known for her research on how human activities influence the atmosphere, particularly with respect to biomass burning and the ozone hole.

Education and career 
Logan has a B.Sc. in chemistry from the University of Edinburgh, Scotland (1971) and a Ph.D. in physical chemistry from  the Massachusetts Institute of Technology (1975). She subsequently worked as a research fellow at Harvard University, was a Fellow at the Environmental Protection Agency in Washington DC, and then return to Harvard in 1979 where she remained until her retirement in 2013.

Research 
An overarching theme of Logan's research is how anthropogenic activities influence the composition of the atmosphere. Broadly, her research includes investigations into how fires impact particles in the atmosphere, how changes in climate impact air quality, the use of satellite data to measure ozone, and modeling efforts that link current and past atmospherical datasets. 

After her Ph.D. research on halogens,  Logan considered how people influence atmospheric chemistry through actions including biomass burning, agriculture, and the release of chlorocarbons. She extended this research to identify spatial and temporal variability in ozone levels in the troposphere and directly linked the loss of atmospheric ozone with the presence of halogens, chlorine, and bromine.  She also examined long-term, global, trends in ozone levels starting with data from 1970s through to the early 1990s.  Her research identified how sulfur-based atmospheric pollutants can form SO and she presented a global view of inorganic compounds in the troposphere.

Logan's research links atmospheric conditions with climate change on earth. Her research details how the distribution of ozone in the atmosphere changes global surface temperatures and how vegetation in rural areas is exposed to ozone that is produced from anthropogenic emissions of NO compounds. 

Forest fires introduce chemical compounds into the atmosphere and Logan's research in this arena has examined the global impact of the fires in Alaska and Canada and California.  She quantified the amount of chemical compounds produce during biomass burning in the developing world and how photochemical changes in particles produced from biomass burning impact ozone concentrations in the troposphere.

Logan's participation in large-scale modeling efforts include research on a global model of atmospheric chemistry that examines interactions between NO compounds and hydrocarbons, models of optical thickness of aerosols, causes of long-term trends in atmospheric ozone, and modeling of carbon monoxide produced during biomass burning.

In 2001, Logan contributed to the section of Intergovernmental Panel on Climate Change (IPCC) report that covers "Atmospheric Chemistry and Greenhouse Gases".

Selected publications

Awards and honors 
 Fellow, American Association for the Advancement of Science (1997)
 Fellow, American Geophysical Union (2001)

References

External links 
 

Fellows of the American Geophysical Union
 Fellows of the American Association for the Advancement of Science
Alumni of the University of Edinburgh
 Massachusetts Institute of Technology alumni
 Harvard University faculty
 Atmospheric scientists
Women atmospheric scientists
Year of birth missing (living people)
Living people